Reha Hutin (April 10, 1945; also known as Reha Hutin-Kutlu) is a Turkish-French producer and journalist. She is president of the 30 Million Friends Foundation, and head of the editorial board of 30 millions d'amis magazine.

Life 
She studied at Chatelard School , and  the University of Geneva.   From 1977 to 1989, she wrote for the television program "L'Avenir du futur", a science program, broadcast on TF1 , with her husband Jean-Pierre Hutin.

In March 1978, they launched the magazine "30 Millions Amis".

References 

1945 births
French journalists
Living people
French people of Turkish descent